Ana Sofía Soberanes González (born 9 April 1977) is a Mexican former rower. She competed at the 1996 Summer Olympics and the 2000 Summer Olympics.

References

External links
 

1977 births
Living people
Mexican female rowers
Olympic rowers of Mexico
Rowers at the 1996 Summer Olympics
Rowers at the 2000 Summer Olympics
Rowers from Mexico City
Rowers at the 1995 Pan American Games
Pan American Games bronze medalists for Mexico
Medalists at the 1995 Pan American Games
Pan American Games medalists in rowing